Mehari (Amharic: መሀሪ (mehārī) or መሐሪ (meḥārī), its literal meaning in the Amharic-language being "merciful", "forgiving") is a male given name of Ethiopian and Eritrean origin which like all Ethiopian male given names can also be used as a surname and may refer to:

Surname
Mizan Mehari (1980–2007), Ethiopian-born Australian athlete
Rehaset Mehari (born 1989), Eritrean long-distance runner
Senait Ghebrehiwet Mehari (born 1974), Eritrean-born German singer

Given name
Mehari Okubamicael (born 1945), Ethiopian former cyclist
Mehari Shinash (born 198?), Eritrean footballer

References

Ethiopian given names
Amharic-language names